Levi Sap Nei Thang is a Burmese-born American perfume entrepreneur known for the purchasing of hundreds of federal leases from the Bureau of Land Management and flipping them to Burmese immigrants at high profit margins.

Career

Business

Levi was born in Chin State, Myanmar and immigrated to the United States in 2000. She launched the Myanmar Bible Software in 2006 which includes 16 Bibles of the ethnic Languages in Myanmar. The software project was started in 2003 in the partnership with Myanmar Bible Society, the United Bible Society (UBS) and CrossWire Bible Society She is representing Myanmar at Expo 2023 Kahramanmaraş in Turkey. She signed contract with Mayor Hanefi Machcicek of Onikişubat City Kahramamanras. Levi represented Myanmar at Expo 2016 in Antalya, Turkey. She represented Myanmar and designed the Myanmar Pavilion at Taichung World Flora Exposition 2018 in Taichung, Taiwan. She became a public figure in the Burmese immigrant community, describing herself on Facebook as a successful businesswoman, and a philanthropist. CNN reports that she is the deputy director of Myanmar Pavilion, which says she was appointed by the previous government of Aung San Suu Kyi.

Fraud allegations
In 2020, she became the United States' one of the top buyers of oil-and-gas leases at the Trump administration's federal auctions. She has spent about $3.7 million on nearly 300 government leases covering 133,000 acres in 12 states.

Levi mass purchased oil leases in 2020 and claimed "I always wanted to be an owner of oil and gas drilling, People have contacted me to see if I would sell and I said no. They said they would pay a little more." She quickly resold the oil leases in the United States at very high profit margins to the Burmese people with no oil drilling experience. She advertised the leases on social media to her 600,000 followers, promising them high returns.

Humanitarian 
Levi founded the charitable organization I Love Myanmar in 2001 which has provided many relief aids to the people affected by Cyclone Nargis in 2008. Her daughter died while she was supporting the victims of the cyclone. She has donated the Intensive Care Unit (ICU) to Yangon Children's Hospital and medicines to other hospitals in Chin State in memory of her daughter Emanuel. She has also established the Emanuel Foundation.

She donated 286 houses for storm survivors in Daukkyi and Thechaung, Bogale the southern part of Myanmar. The donation was accepted by Brig-Gen Kyaw Myint, the Deputy Minister of Social Welfare, Relief, and Resettlement of Myanmar.

References

Living people
Burmese philanthropists
Burmese businesspeople
People from Chin State
Year of birth missing (living people)